Viola purpurea is a species of violet with yellow flowers and the common name goosefoot violet.

Habitat and Range
Viola purpurea grows in foothills and mountains across much the western United States, including the Cascade Mountains, the coastal ranges and Sierra Nevada in California, and the Rocky Mountains. In the Wenatchee Mountains in Washington State it is notable for being common on serpentine soils.

Description
This is a small plant which bears thick to fleshy toothed or ridged oval leaves which are mostly green but may have a purplish tint to them. The leaves have prominent indented veins. The flowers are made up of bright yellow petals, the lowermost being streaked or veined with purple and the lateral petals with purplish undersides.

Taxonomy
There are several subspecies, most of which are known by the common name goosefoot violet. These subspecies are found across the western United States from Wyoming to California. It is a member of the chaparral plant community and the foothills and low elevation mountains.

Subspecies of Viola purpurea 
 Viola purpurea subsp. charlestonensis , found as high as 8500 ft elevation.
 Viola purpurea subsp. dimorpha 
 Viola purpurea subsp. geophyta
 Viola purpurea subsp. integrifolia
 Viola purpurea subsp. mesophyta
 Viola purpurea subsp. mohavensis
 Viola purpurea subsp. purpurea
 Viola purpurea subsp. quercetorum
 Viola purpurea subsp. venosa, most widely distributed variety.

References

External links

purpurea
Flora of the Western United States
Flora without expected TNC conservation status